Pohorovice is a municipality and village in Strakonice District in the South Bohemian Region of the Czech Republic. It has about 70 inhabitants.

Administrative parts
The village of Kloub is an administrative part of Pohorovice.

References

Villages in Strakonice District